Chi Van Dang is a hematological oncologist and researcher, currently serving as the Scientific Director of Ludwig Institute for Cancer Research. He is known for his research on genetics, the MYC gene and the cellular energy metabolism of cancer. 

Dang has served as president of the American Society for Clinical Investigation.  He has been elected to the National Academy of Medicine, the  American Association for Cancer Research, the American Academy of Arts and Sciences, the American Society for Clinical Investigation, and the Association of American Physicians, among others.

Early life and academics
Chi Van Dang was born in Saigon, Vietnam as one of ten children. Dang's father was Chieu Van Dang, Vietnam's first neurosurgeon and was once the dean of the University of Saigon School of Medicine. 

After arriving in the United States in 1967, Dang completed his B.S. degree in Chemistry at the University of Michigan in 1975, his Ph.D in chemistry at Georgetown University in 1978,  and M.D. from Johns Hopkins University, in 1982. At the University of California, San Francisco, he completed a fellowship on Hematology-Oncology training where he began to work with the MYC gene.

Career
In 1987, Dang returned to Johns Hopkins where he took a faculty position. He was Director of the Division of Hematology at Johns Hopkins Hospital  from 1993-2003.  He also served as Johns Hopkins Family Professor in Oncology Research.  As of 2002, he became Vice Dean for Research, and Director of the Johns Hopkins Institute for Cell Engineering.

From 2002 to 2003, Dang was the President of the American Society for Clinical Investigation. In his 2003 presidential address, he remarked, "I wish to remind all of us of the power of healing. Be it in the laboratory, at the cageside, bedside or computerside, we, as physicians, all have the ability to heal."

As of September 1, 2011, Dang became the John H. Glick Professor of Medicine and the Director of the Abramson Cancer Center at the University of Pennsylvania. 

As of July 1, 2017, Dang became the Scientific Director of the Ludwig Institute for Cancer Research, with the responsibility of overseeing the Institute's scientific strategy for studying the prevention, diagnosis, and treatment of cancer. The Ludwig Institute has branches  in the United States, Switzerland, and the United Kingdom. 
He was also appointed a professor at the Wistar Institute on the campus of the University of Pennsylvania, which hosts the Ludwig Laboratory during his tenure as The Ludwig Institute's Scientific Director.

In 2018, Dang became Editor-in-Chief of Cancer Research, a peer-reviewed scientific journal published by the American Association for Cancer Research. He published his first editorial in January.

Research
Dang's research has focused on cancer cells and genetics, notably on energy utilization of cancer cells. Research  Dang's laboratories has contributed to the understanding of the function of the MYC a gene associated with different cancers. Dang has examined the mechanisms and molecular signaling pathways governing the metabolism of cancer. By first establishing the mechanistic link between MYC and cellular energy metabolism, he identified the MYC gene as a master regulator of cell proliferation and cellular metabolism. This research has contributed to the idea that genetic alterations re-program the energy utilization of tumors and specialize cancer cells to rely on specific fuel sources.
This work may help to explain the Warburg effect. Disrupting communication signalling pathways in cancer cells is a possible strategy for the development of drugs to battle cancer.

Eric Fearon conducted his postdoctoral research in Dang's laboratory, where he developed a system for the study of protein-protein interactions in living mammalian cells.

Dang is also a proponent of chronotherapy, the idea that the delivery of drugs can be timed to take advantage of the body’s natural 24-hour rhythms, to minimize side effects and maximize treatment effectiveness. The National Cancer Institute has begun to support research into the function and regulation of clock genes and interactions between circadian rhythms, diseases, and treatments.

Awards
 2018, Fellow, American Association for Cancer Research (AACR)
 2012, Distinguished Alumnus Award for Scientific Achievement, Johns Hopkins University
 2011,  Fellow, American Academy of Arts and Sciences 
 2006, Member, National Academy of Medicine
 2005, Golden Torch Award, Vietnamese-American National Gala
 2003, Mark Brothers Award, Indiana University School of Medicine
 1997, Member, Association of American Physicians
 1996, Member,  American Association for Cancer Research (AACR)
 1993, Member, American Society for Clinical Investigation

References

Cancer researchers
American hematologists
Fellows of the American Academy of Arts and Sciences
Fellows of the AACR Academy
Members of the National Academy of Medicine